Eduardo Gilardoni (born 9 November 1935) is a composer, pianist, harpsichordist, vocal coach, and early music specialist.

Born in Conchillas, Uruguay, Gilardoni started his piano studies at the Franz Liszt Conservatory in Montevideo with Esther Giucci, composition with Carlos Giucci and Héctor Tosar and continued his piano studies with Santiago Baranda Reyes, Sara Bourdillion, Hugo Balzo and Armano Bascans.

In 1964 he moved to Barcelona on a scholarship from the Institute of Hispanic Culture and studied with the singer Conchita Badia, the pianist Alicia de Larrocha and composers Joaquin Nin and Federico Mompou.

When he returned to Uruguay in 1966 he became a harpsichord professor at the Anglo Institute, a position he held for eighteen years. Since then he became a much sought after collaborative pianist with the top singers of Uruguay. From 1995 to 2005 he was a visiting artist at the University of Charleston, SC.

In 2006 he represented Uruguay in the Song Festival at the University of Central Arkansas. He has performed and presented his works in concerts and festivals in Brazil, Perú, Argentina, Spain, United States and Bolivia.

Three compact discs with his works have been released and the Ministry of Education and Culture of Uruguay published two volumes of his complete works for piano, voice and chamber music.

References

External links 

1935 births
Living people
Male classical composers
People from Colonia Department
Uruguayan classical composers
Uruguayan harpsichordists